Leptachirus is a genus of small soles native to brackish and fresh water in New Guinea and northern Australia.

Species
There are currently nine recognized species in this genus:
 Leptachirus alleni J. E. Randall, 2007 (Allen's Sole)
 Leptachirus bensbach J. E. Randall, 2007 (Bensbach River Sole)
 Leptachirus darwinensis J. E. Randall, 2007 (Darwin Sole)
 Leptachirus kikori J. E. Randall, 2007 (Kikori River Sole)
 Leptachirus klunzingeri (M. C. W. Weber, 1907) (Tailed sole)
 Leptachirus lorentz J. E. Randall, 2007 (Lorentz River Sole)
 Leptachirus polylepis J. E. Randall, 2007 (Manyscale Sole)
 Leptachirus robertsi J. E. Randall, 2007 (Robert's Sole)
 Leptachirus triramus J. E. Randall, 2007 (Three-line Sole)

References

Soleidae
Freshwater fish genera
Taxa named by John Ernest Randall